Fred E. Sterling (June 29, 1869 – February 10, 1934) was an American newspaper editor and politician.

Born in Dixon, Illinois, Sterling moved with his family to a farm in Huron, South Dakota when he was 11. Sterling was a newspaper editor in Rockford, Illinois and started the Rockford  Register-Gazette. Sterling was involved with the Republican Party. He served on the Rockford City Council. In 1917, Sterling was appointed to the Illinois Public Utilities Commission and then in 1919 was elected Illinois State Treasurer. He then served as Lieutenant Governor of Illinois from 1921 until 1933. He died in Rockford, Illinois due to a heart ailment and high blood pressure.

He was indicted for embezzlement after he left office as state treasurer, but the charges were not pursued while another embezzlement case against Illinois governor Len Small was under way.  After that case was settled, Sterling's case was dismissed by Illinois Attorney General Oscar Carlstrom, but Carlstrom's successor, Otto Kerner, reinstated the charges, and they were still pending when Sterling died.

He was survived by his wife, Anna, and a son and daughter, Arthur and Olive Sterling.

Notes

1869 births
1934 deaths
American people of Scottish descent
People from Dixon, Illinois
People from Rockford, Illinois
Editors of Illinois newspapers
Illinois Republicans
Illinois city council members
State treasurers of Illinois
Lieutenant Governors of Illinois
Journalists from Illinois
People from Huron, South Dakota